The 1824 United States presidential election in Tennessee took place between October 26 and December 2, 1824, as part of the 1824 United States presidential election. Voters chose 11 representatives, or electors, to the Electoral College, who voted for President and Vice President.

During this election, the Democratic-Republican Party was the only major national party and four different candidates from this party sought the Presidency. Tennessee voted for Andrew Jackson over William H. Crawford, John Quincy Adams, and Henry Clay. Jackson won Tennessee, his home state, by a wide margin of 95.94%.

Results

References

Tennessee
1824
1824 Tennessee elections